William de Braose or Brewose or Briouze may refer to:

William de Braose, 1st Lord of Bramber (died 1093/1096)
William de Braose, 3rd Lord of Bramber (fl. 1135–1179)
William de Braose, 4th Lord of Bramber (1140/1150–1211) infamous for the Christmas Day Massacre of Welsh Princes at Abergavenny Castle in 1175
William de Braose (died 1230), son of Reginald de Braose, hanged by Llywelyn the Great
William de Braose (bishop), bishop of Llandaff Cathedral from 1266 to 1287
William de Braose, 1st Baron Braose (died 1291)
William de Braose, 2nd Baron Braose (died 1326)

See also
 Baron Braose
 House of Braose